Ariel Pagtalonia Manalo (born February 12, 1966), known professionally as Jose Manalo, is a Filipino actor, director, and comedian best known for appearing regularly on the noon-time variety show Eat Bulaga! on GMA Network. He is also known for his observational comedy humor in his stand-up performances.

Career
Manalo first appeared in the children's educational show Boyoyong in 1990. He also appears on TV soap opera series Valiente in 1992 as one of the supporting characters. He later started working behind the scenes as a production assistant on Eat Bulaga!. He then became a comedian and with his friend Wally Bayola, who was also entering show business around the same time, later became a comic duo. He also appeared in several sitcoms on GMA Network like Daddy Di Do Du and Ful Haus, both starring Vic Sotto.

In 2010, Manalo returned to TV5 (formerly ABC 5) for his former sitcom, My Darling Aswang with Vic Sotto & Ritchie Reyes (also known as Ritchie D' Horsie). This was his second television program on TV5.

In 2011, Manalo, along with his comedic partner Bayola, headlined his own TV5 comedy show, The Jose and Wally Show Starring Vic Sotto and also Jimmy Santos. Manalo also worked with Vic Sotto in movies, like Pak! Pak! My Dr. Kwak! and the MMFF film entry Enteng ng Ina Mo.

Controversy
In 2012, Jose Manalo's wife (Annalyn) lodged a complaint against the comedian for verbal and emotional abuse. In her affidavit, she claimed that the abuse started in 2011. Manalo denied the charges of abuse and also his wife's accusations of family abandonment and child neglect. In his official statement, Manalo asserted that he provided support, "financial or otherwise," to his children.

In late 2013, however, Manalo's daughter filed a case of violation against her father for failure to provide financial support, which caused her to drop out of school. The following year, his daughter subsequently attempted suicide, citing her family problems and mainly blaming her father as the reason. Manalo had also refuted these allegations by his daughter.

Filmography

Television

TV Movies

Films

Awards and recognitions

References

External links

1966 births
Living people
Male actors from Manila
People from Tondo, Manila
Tagalog people
Filipino male comedians
Filipino male film actors
GMA Network personalities
Filipino television variety show hosts
Filipino television talk show hosts
TV5 (Philippine TV network) personalities
Filipino male television actors